The 2017 Galway Senior Football Championship is the 122nd edition of Galway GAA's premier Gaelic football tournament for senior graded clubs in County Galway, Ireland. The winners receive the Frank Fox Cup and represent Galway in the Connacht Senior Club Football Championship.

Twenty teams compete. The championship has a back-door format for the first two rounds before proceeding to a knock-out format. Generally, any team to lose two matches will be knocked out of the championship.

Corofin were the defending champions after they defeated Salthill/Knocknacarra in the previous year's final.

This was Monivea-Abbey's return the senior grade.

Team Changes
The following teams have changed division since the 2016 championship season.

To S.F.C.
Promoted from 2016 Galway Intermediate Football Championship
 Monivea-Abbey  -  (Intermediate Champions)

From S.F.C.
Relegated to 2018 Galway Intermediate Football Championship
 Cárna-Caiseal

Rounds 1 to 3

Round 1 
All 20 teams enter the competition in this round. The 10 winners progress to Round 2A while the 10 losers progress to Round 2B.

Round 2

Round 2A
The 10 winners from Round 1 enter this round. The 5 winners will enter the draw for the Preliminary Quarter Finals while the 5 losers will play in Round 3.

Round 2B
The 10 losers from Round 1 enter this round. The 5 winners will go into the Round 3 while the 5 losers will enter the Relegation Playoffs.

Round 3

The 5 losers from Round 2A enter this round and they play the 5 winners from Round 2B. The 5 winners will go into the draw for the Preliminary Quarter-Finals while the 5 losers will enter the Relegation Playoffs.

Knockout stage

Preliminary Quarter-Finals

The 5 Round 2A winners and the 5 Round 3 winners are entered into a draw to choose 4 teams to play in this round. The 2 winners (along with the 6 teams who receive byes) will proceed to the quarter-finals.

Quarter-finals

The 2 winners from the Preliminary Quarter-Finals (along with the 6 teams who received byes) enter the quarter-finals.

Semi-finals

Final

Last Ten

Relegation Playoffs
The 5 Round 2B losers and 5 Round 3 losers enter the Relegation Playoff.

Relegation preliminary round
A draw was conducted and 4 teams were chosen to play in the Relegation Preliminary Round. The 2 winners earn their place in the S.F.C. for 2017 while the losers enter the Relegation Quarter-Finals along with the 6 clubs who received byes.

Relegation Quarter-Finals
The 2 Relegation Preliminary Round losers enter the Relegation Quarter-Finals along with the 6 clubs who received byes. The 4 winners will earn their place in the 2017 S.F.C. while the 4 losers will enter the Relegation Semi-Finals.

Relegation Semi-Finals

The 4 Relegation Quarter-Final losers play against each other in this round. The 2 winners will earn their place in the 2017 S.F.C. while the 2 losers will enter the Relegation Final.

Relegation Final
The winner will earn their place in the 2017 S.F.C. while the  loser will be relegated to the Intermediate grade.

References

Galway Senior Football Championship
Galway Senior Football Championship